PBAN may refer to these articles:

 Pheromone biosynthesis activating neuropeptide
 Polybutadiene acrylonitrile